Delirious may refer to:

 A state of delirium

Film and television
 Delirious (1991 film), an American comedy directed by Tom Mankiewicz, starring John Candy
 Delirious (2006 film), an American comedy-drama directed by Tom DiCillo, starring Steve Buscemi
 Eddie Murphy Delirious, a 1983 stand-up comedy TV special

Music
 Delirious?, a 1992–2009 English Christian rock band
 "Delirious" (David Guetta song), 2007
 "Delirious" (Prince song), 1982
 "Delirious (Boneless)", a song by Steve Aoki, Chris Lake, Tujamo, and Kid Ink, 2014
 "Delirious", a song by Vistoso Bosses featuring Soulja Boy, 2009
 "Delirious", a song by ZZ Top from Afterburner, 1985

Other uses 
 Delirious (wrestler), Hunter Johnston (born 1980), American professional wrestler 
 De.lirio.us, a defunct social bookmarking site taken over by Simpy
 H2O Delirious, Youtuber and game commentator